Bitterfeld was a district in Saxony-Anhalt, Germany. It was bounded by (from the north and clockwise) the city of Dessau, the district of Wittenberg, Delitzsch (Saxony) and the districts of Saalkreis and Köthen.

History 
The district was a swampy and unpopulated area in the early Middle Ages. In the 12th century Flemish settlers helped to drain the swamps. In that time Bitterfeld was known as "the Flemish town" in the region. The present district is roughly identical with the old county of Brehna, which ruled the area from the 10th to the 13th century. Later the region became a part of Saxony.

When Prussia gained the northern parts of Saxony (including the lands around Bitterfeld), the district of Bitterfeld was established. After the dissolution of Anhalt some places in the north were added to the district.

The East German government tried to establish a socialistic industrial centre in the Bitterfeld region. The city of Bitterfeld and the entire district were infamous for polluted air, poisoned rivers and devastated landscape. After the German reunification there have been measures to change these conditions. Today the power plants work with modern filters, and sewage works greatly improve the water conditions.

During the Kreisreform 2007 the district was merged with Köthen and a large part of Anhalt-Zerbst into the new district Anhalt-Bitterfeld.

Geography 
The Mulde River crossed the district from south to north.

Coat of arms

Towns and municipalities

External links 
  (German)
Unofficial website (German)
Website from the Level-Tower (German)